Ole Ludvig Bærøe (29 January 1877 - 22 March 1943) was a Norwegian politician for the Conservative Party. Bærøe was Minister of Agriculture 1926–1928, as well as head of the Ministry of Education and Church Affairs 1927–1928. He was a headmaster by profession before entering the Lykke Government in 1926. Bærøe was leader of the Conservative Party from 1937 to 1940, though legally he was leader until his death in 1943 despite political parties being forbidden in Norway during the German occupation.

References

1877 births
1943 deaths
Government ministers of Norway
Leaders of the Conservative Party (Norway)
Ministers of Education of Norway